HungarianTV-America, Inc. is a wholly owned subsidiary of EURO-World Network Inc. and the broadcaster's representative for North America. The company broadcasts Hungarian radio and television programming to the Hungarian communities in North America (Canada and the United States).

HungarianTV-America has launched six Hungarian television channels and one Hungarian radio channels and plans on launching others.

Television Channels
 Duna TV
 m2
 Magyar ATV
 HírTV
 Echo TV

Radio Channels
 Folk Radio

Availability
The HungarianTV-America programming package is available in North America on the NexTV-America Internet Television platform. HungarianTV-America intends to be available on DirecTV, Dish Network and some of the major cable networks in the US and Canada in 2010.

See also
 DUNA TV
 M2
 ATV
 HIRTV

References 

Television networks in Hungary
24-hour television news channels in the United States

hu:Hír Televízió
hu:Hír TV
hu:Magyar ATV
hu:Duna TV
hu:Magyar Televízió